Bring it On! is the second album by the Danish psychobilly band, HorrorPops. It was released on September 13, 2005 on Hellcat Records. It was recorded in Sound City Studios, Van Nuys, California during 2005. It was produced by Brett Gurewitz.

Track listing 

All tracks by Day, Gaarde, Kresge & Stendahl

 "Freaks in Uniforms" – 2:45
 "Hit 'n Run" – 3:34
 "Bring It On!" – 2:17
 "It's Been So Long" – 3:27
 "Undefeated" – 2:52
 "You vs. Me" – 4:00
 "Crawl Straight Home" – 2:50
 "Trapped" – 3:19
 "Walk Like a Zombie" – 4:07
 "Where You Can't Follow" – 3:05
 "Caught in a Blonde" – 2:58
 "S.O.B" – 3:25
 "Who's Leading You Now" – 2:50

Personnel 

 Octavio Arizala – Photography
 Tom Baker – Mastering
 Patricia Day – Chant
 Greg Gordon – Engineer
 Brett Gurewitz – Background Vocals, Producer, Mixing
 Geoff Kresge – Guitar, Group Member
 Pete Martinez – Engineer
 Kim Nekroman – Guitar, Graphic Design, Layout Design, Group Member
 Nonô – Chant
 Joshua Douglas Smith – Assistant Engineer 
 Henrik "Niedermeier" Stendahl - Drums

2005 albums
HorrorPops albums
Albums recorded at Sound City Studios